Mountain Top University  is a private university in Makogi Oba, Ogun State, Nigeria, founded in 2015. It was founded by Mountain of Fire and Miracles Ministries, a Pentecostal Christian denomination. The university was founded by Dr. D.K. Olukoya, the founder and General Overseer of MFM Ministries worldwide.They Are Empowered To Excel

References

External links

https://AQ

Education in Ogun State
Educational institutions established in 2015
2015 establishments in Nigeria
Christian universities and colleges in Nigeria